The 1966 World Fencing Championships were held in Moscow, Soviet Union. The event took place from July 6 to July 16, 1966. They were organized by the USSR Fencing Federation.

Medal table

Medal summary

Men's events

Women's events

References

FIE Results

World Fencing Championships
F
F
World Fencing Championships
1966 in Moscow
Sports competitions in Moscow
Fencing in the Soviet Union
1966 in fencing